Nuba is a Palestinian village located eleven kilometers north-west of Hebron.The village is in the Hebron Governorate of the State of Palestine, in the southern West Bank. According to the Palestinian Central Bureau of Statistics, the village had a population of 4,336 in 2007.

History
The village is mentioned in a late 14th-century document of the Mamluk Sultanate who ruled Palestine from Cairo where three villagers are named as "ar'ru'asā ["the leaders"] in the village of Nūbā".

Ottoman era
Nuba, like the rest of Palestine, was incorporated into the Ottoman Empire in 1516, and in the census of 1596, the village appeared in the tax registers as being in the Nahiya of Halil of the Liwa of Quds.  It had a population of 82  Muslim households. The villagers  paid a fixed tax rate of 25%   on wheat, barley, vineyards and fruit trees, occasional revenues, goats and/or beehives; a total of 10,000 akçe.

In 1838, Edward Robinson noted Nuba  as a Muslim village, between the mountains and Gaza, but subject to the government of Hebron. It was one of a cluster of villages at the foot of a mountain, together with Kharas and Beit Ula.

An Ottoman village list of about 1870 showed that Nuba had  52 houses and a population of 200, though the population count included men, only.   

In 1883, PEF's Survey of Western Palestine  described Nuba as a "small village perched on a low hill, with a well about a mile to the east."

In 1896 the population of  Nuba was estimated to be about 537 persons.

British Mandate era
In the 1922 census of Palestine conducted by the British Mandate authorities,   Nuba' had a population 357, all   Muslims.  This had increased   at the time of the 1931 census to  611 Muslims, in 140 houses.

In the 1945 statistics the population of Nuba was  760, all Muslims, who owned 22,836 dunams of land  according to an official land and population survey. 403 dunams were plantations and irrigable land, 10,116  for cereals, while 33 dunams were built-up (urban) land.

Jordanian era
In the wake of the 1948 Arab–Israeli War, and after the 1949 Armistice Agreements, Nuba came under Jordanian rule.

The Jordanian census of 1961 found 1,075 inhabitants in  Nuba.

Post-1967
Since the Six-Day War in 1967,  Nuba has been under Israeli occupation.

Footnotes

Bibliography

External links
Welcome To The City of Nuba
Nuba, Welcome to Palestine
Survey of Western Palestine, Map 21:  IAA, Wikimedia commons
Nuba Village (Fact Sheet), Applied Research Institute–Jerusalem (ARIJ)
Nuba Village Profile, ARIJ
Nuba aerial photo, ARIJ
The priorities and needs for development in Nuba village based on the community and local authorities’ assessment, ARIJ

Towns in the West Bank
Hebron Governorate
Municipalities of the State of Palestine